In U.S. history, carpetbagger was a derogatory term for Northerners who moved to the South after the Civil War.

Carpetbagger(s) or The Carpetbagger(s) may also refer to:

 Operation Carpetbagger, a World War II operation to supply resistance fighters in Europe
 The Carpetbaggers, a 1961 novel
 The Carpetbaggers (film), a 1964 film based on the novel
 Carpetbagger (band), an alt-country, Americana band